This article lists political parties in Antigua and Barbuda.
Antigua and Barbuda has a two-party system, which means that there are two dominant political parties, with extreme difficulty for anybody to achieve electoral success under the banner of any other party.

Parties

Major parties

Other parties
Barbuda People's Movement for Change 
Barbudans for a Better Barbuda
Democratic People's Party
First Christian Democratic Party
National Labour Party
National Movement for Change
National Reform Movement
Organisation for National Development

Former parties
Antigua Caribbean Liberation Movement
Barbuda Independence Movement
New Barbuda Development Movement
Progressive Labour Movement 
United National Democratic Party

See also
 Politics of Antigua and Barbuda
 List of political parties by country

Antigua
 
Antigua and Barbuda
Political parties
Parties